Nguyễn Phúc Khoát (26 September 1714 – 7 July 1765) was one of the Nguyễn lords who ruled over the southern portion of Vietnam from the 16th-18th centuries. Also known as Chúa Võ (主武) or Võ vương (武王) (roughly Martial Prince), he continued the southern expansion undertaken by his predecessor, Nguyễn Phúc Trú. Provinces and districts originally belonging to Cambodia were taken by Võ vương. The Vietnamese-Cambodian border established by the end of his reign remains the border today. The de jure pretense of loyalty to the Lê dynasty was performed by Võ vương.

In 1747, Võ vương sent a number of Vietnamese warriors to aid rebel princes of Cambodia against the newly crowned Cambodian King Ang Tong. These forces seized Sóc Trăng town and then moved towards Oudong, then royal capital of Cambodia. Ang Tong requested aid from Mạc Thiên Tứ, who secured a truce with the Nguyễn lord, in exchange for a few more provinces, namely Gò Công and Tân An. Ten years later, the Cambodian throne was seized by Outey II, with the help of Nguyễn and Mac. In return for their contributions, he granted them seven provinces, including Sóc Trăng, Trà Vinh, Kampot, and Kompong Som.

Võ vương died in 1765, and was succeeded by his sixteenth son, Nguyễn Phúc Thuần. The presumed heir was originally his second son Chuong Vo. After his death, his demise was taken advantage of by the Tay Son and its subsequent rebellion later in 1778.

Culture 
Trousers and tunics on the Chinese pattern in 1774 were ordered by the Võ vương Emperor to replace the traditional Vietnamese skirt of women. However, Han-Chinese clothing are assembled by several pieces of clothing including both pants and skirts called Qun (裙) or chang (裳) which is a part of Hanfu garments throughout the history of Han Chinese clothing. The Chinese Han, Tang and Ming dynasty clothing was referred by Võ vương.

Missionaries and Christianity were banned by Võ vương in 1750, however he did listened to music by western missionaries.

References

Sources
Coedes, G. (1962). The Making of South-east Asia. London: Cox & Wyman Ltd. p213.

1714 births
1765 deaths
Khoat